John Deere Cady (January 26, 1866 – November 12, 1933) was an American golfer who competed in the 1904 Summer Olympics. He was the grandson of John Deere and the great-grandson of Linus Yale, Sr.

In 1904 he was part of the American team which won the silver medal. He finished 23rd in this competition. In the individual competition he finished 27th in the qualification and was eliminated in the first round of the match play.

References

External links
 
 
 

American male golfers
Amateur golfers
Olympic silver medalists for the United States in golf
Golfers at the 1904 Summer Olympics
Medalists at the 1904 Summer Olympics
Golfers from Massachusetts
People from Watertown, Massachusetts
Sportspeople from Middlesex County, Massachusetts
1866 births
1933 deaths